Gerard Kerry Reinmuth (born 27 October 1970, in Battery Point) is an Australian architect. He is a director of architectural practice TERROIR, which has been featured in a number of international exhibitions and publications the Venice Biennale, AV Monographs’ 20 International Emerging Architects, Phaidon’s 10×10/3 and Atlas of 21st Century Architecture, Australian Financial Review (AFR), TEDXSydney, AV Monographs’ 20 International Emerging Architects, Phaidon’s 10×10/3 and Atlas of 21st Century Architecture. Most recently he was selected to be a judge at the 2020 World Architecture Festival  to be held in Lisbon.

Academic career 
Reinmuth graduated in 1991 with first-class honours in Bachelor of Environmental Design from the University of Tasmania and a Bachelor Architecture from the University of Sydney in 1996 as well as Masters in Architecture from Royal Melbourne Institute of Technology in 2007.  He has been the Adjunct Professor of Architecture, at the University of Technology Sydney (UTS) since 2005 Reinmuth, is the founder of the International Studio at the Aarhus School of Architecture in Denmark, where he is also a Visiting Professor.

Professional associations include appointment as a Life Fellow of the Royal Australian Institute of Architects in 2018; a Registered Architect in the State of New South Wales since 2000 and a Register Architect in Denmark since 2009.

Career 
Reinmuth's first role was at Forward Viney Architects in Hobart from 1991 to 1995. One of the partners, Michael Viney, subsequently became a major influence and subject of his thesis at the University of Sydney in 1996.  At Forward Viney Architects his colleagues included Nicholas Murcutt, Gaetano Palmese and Craig Rosevear. In 1995, Reinmuth commenced work at Denton Corker Marshall’s Sydney office, later to become JPW, where he worked predominantly for Richard Johnson on projects including the Asian Gallery at the AGNSW, 363 George Street and the Western Courtyard at the Australian War Memorial in Canberra. From 1998 to 1999 he worked as a project architect for Stirling Tolbooth at Richard Murphy Architects in Edinburgh.

TERROIR 
In 1999 he co-founded the architectural practise TERROIR with Richard Blythe and Scott Balmforth. A strong relationship between these three individuals fuelled an ambition to develop a practice underpinned by a culture of creativity, driven by an ambition for design excellence and which approaches project work as an opportunity for original design research. The practice is a micro-international practice which remains mid-sized at 35 staff.

Key projects 

 Penguin Parade (Philip Island, 2019)
 Tornhuset, in conjunction with Kim Utzon (Sweden, 2014)
 Maitland City Bowling Club (Maitland, 2014)
 Aarhus Housing, in conjunction with CUBO Arkitekter (Denmark, 2013)
 Burnie Maker’s Workshop (Tasmania, 2009)
 Statens Naturhistoriske Museum (Copenhagen, 2009)
 Commonwealth Place Kiosks (Canberra, 2008)
 86-88 George Street (Sydney, 2005
 Peppermint Bay(Hobart, 2003)
 Tolmans Hill House (Tasmania, 2003)

Awards

References

External links 

 TERROIR official webpage

Living people
1970 births
University of New South Wales alumni
New South Wales architects
Architects from Sydney